Awakening of Aggression is the fourth solo album by video game music composer Frank Klepacki, released in 2006 and featuring, as usual, ten songs.

Track listing 
 "Awakening"
 "Kill"
 "Krung Kick"
 "Strange"
 "Fantasy"
 "Rox"
 "Brain Dead"
 "Magnafried"
 "Vigilante"
 "Rage and Fury"

2006 albums
Frank Klepacki albums